This Lady Called Life is a 2020 Nigerian romance drama written by Toluwani Obayan, and directed by Kayode Kasum. The film stars Lota Chukwu, Bisola Aiyeola and Wale Ojo in the lead roles. The film had its theatrical release on 9 October 2020 and opened to extremely positive reviews from critics. The film is rated as one of the best Nigerian films of 2020.

Synopsis 
Aiye (Bisola Aiyeola) who is a young single mother financially struggling to cope up with the rising cost of living in the modern city of Lagos. She works extremely hard running a modest business that barely supports her to have a decent but not a luxury standard of living. She wants to prove her worth while working as a chef in order to fulfill her desire. She wants to become a renowned chef as she was abandoned by her own family.

Cast 

 Bisola Aiyeola as Aiye
 Lota Chukwu as Omo
 Wale Ojo as daddy
 Tina Mba as mummy
 Jemima Osunde as Toke
 Efa Iwara as Obinna
 Uche Elumelu as neighbour

Production and release 
The film marks the second collaboration between actress Bisola Aiyeola and director Kayode Kasum after Sugar Rush (2019). The film was predominantly shot and set in Lagos.

It was released theatrically on October 9, 2020 and premiered on Netflix on April 23, 2021.

Awards and nominations

References

External links 

 
 

2020 romantic drama films
English-language Nigerian films
Films shot in Lagos
Nigerian romantic drama films
Films set in Lagos
Films directed by Kayode Kasum
2020s English-language films